John Hampson Wells (May 13, 1911 in Moose Jaw, Saskatchewan – May 26, 1999), also known as Cactus Jack, was a Winnipeg-based radio and television broadcaster specializing in sports.

Biography
Wells's career began in 1936. While listening to a hockey broadcast on CFQC, Wells boasted he could do a better job than the guy on the mike. Dared by a chum to prove his claim, Jack applied for a job at the station, and was hired.

In 1939, Wells joined CJAT-FM in Trail, British Columbia as an all-round announcer and play-by-play man for the Trail Smoke Eaters.

In 1941, Wells got a job as a sports announcer at CJRW in Winnipeg. CJRC provided Wells with his first experience in football broadcasting, and he began calling games for the Winnipeg Blue Bombers. Jack became a free-lance broadcaster after gaining the exclusive rights to broadcast from Shea's Amphitheatre and Osborne Stadium which, in turn gave him the right to sell time to any one of the Winnipeg stations.

It was during an announcing stint on CKY that Jack acquired his illustrious nickname. When Jack filled in for Porky Charbonneau on his western show, it occurred to Wells that he should have a moniker and adopted "Cactus" and it became one of the most famous in Canadian broadcasting. Jack was famous for reporting the weather with the phrase, "Well, it turned out nice again." even when calling in from his winter location of Phoenix, Arizona.

During his career, Jack Wells broadcast on four Winnipeg stations - CKRC, CKY, CJOB and CFRW. In the early 1950s, he became the first television voice of Western Conference Football for the CFL on CBC. In 1952, Wells turned down the play by play job on Hockey Night in Canada to remain in Winnipeg. The job eventually went to the Danny Gallivan.

Wells was closely associated with the national curling scene, beginning in 1952 when he covered his first Macdonald Brier. In the following years, Wells reported on provincial events in Manitoba, the Brier, the women's Macdonald Lassie and the World Curling Championships. Wells was appointed head of public relations in Western Canada for Macdonald Tobacco in 1970.

Wells was inducted to the CAB Hall of Fame in 1988. In recognition of his broadcasting career the City of Winnipeg named a street linking Canad Inns Stadium and the former site of Winnipeg Arena after him. He is an "Honoured Member" of the Manitoba Hockey Hall of Fame. He was inducted into the Canadian Football Hall of Fame in 1981.

Wells son, John Wells, worked with him at CKY and later became the first football play-by-play man at TSN.

References

External links
Broadcasting history
Jack Wells's biography

1911 births
1999 deaths
Canadian radio sportscasters
Canadian television sportscasters
People from Moose Jaw
Canadian Football League announcers
Curling broadcasters
Canadian Football Hall of Fame inductees